Jean Raymond Jacquette (28 September 1917 – 16 February 2013), better known by the pen names of Ambroise Yxemerry and Raymond Jacquet, was a French Polynesian editor and journalist. Under his pseudonym, Jacquette wrote novels and reported for the Courrier des EFO, the first independent newspaper in French Polynesia, which he founded in 1949. Jacquette was born in Paris in September 1917, and died in Coutances in February 2013 at the age of 95.

Works

Novels
 Marins en campagne, Paris: Debresse, 1941
 Services à la mer, Paris: Debresse, 1941
 Kerfantan la Breton, Paris: Debresse, 1943
 La terre des Gendru, Paris: Colbert, 1944
 On ne choisit pas sa vie, Paris: La Renaissance du Livre, 1946
 Zidzou matelot malgache, Paris: Ariane, 1946
 L'Ange et la Femme, Paris: La Renaissance du Livre, 1946

References

1917 births
2013 deaths
20th-century French journalists
20th-century French novelists
French male non-fiction writers
French Polynesian writers
20th-century pseudonymous writers